John Henry Powell Schneider (c. 1768 – 1861) was a merchant in London of Swiss origins.

Early life and family
John Schneider was born around 1768, into a family that had moved to England from Switzerland earlier in the century. He became head of John Schneider & Co., London merchants. He resided at Beaver Hall, near Southgate, London. His son Henry Schneider, industrialist and politician, was born there in 1817 to him and his second wife, Elizabeth Moul.

John Schneider & Co.
The firm of John Schneider & Co. imported goods from the Russian Empire, and Schneider was a furrier. He was also involved with the scandal over Mexican debt.

Death
Schneider died at Brighton in 1861, at age 83. His will is held by the British National Archives.

References

Further reading
 Banks, Arthur Geoffrey. (1984) H.W. Schneider of Barrow and Bowness. Titus Wilson.

External links 

1760s births
1861 deaths
English merchants